There are more than  9,000 Grade I listed buildings in England. This page is a list of these buildings in the district of Vale of White Horse in Oxfordshire.

List of buildings

|}

See also
 Grade II* listed buildings in Vale of White Horse
 Grade I listed buildings in Oxfordshire
 Grade I listed buildings in Cherwell (district)
 Grade I listed buildings in Oxford
 Grade I listed buildings in South Oxfordshire
 Grade I listed buildings in West Oxfordshire

Notes

External links

Vale of White Horse
Vale of White Horse
Listed